A lance rest (French: arrêt de cuirasse or arrêt) is a metal flange or hook that is typically attached to the right side of a breastplate, just under the armpit.  The lance rest appeared in the late 14th century, remaining in use until the use of full plate armour and heavy lances became obsolete for general use in the late 16th and early 17th centuries.

The use of a lance rest can be more readily understood by examining the French term arrêt, or "stop" (in the sense of a mechanism which is used to prevent something from moving.) The lance rest was not used to simply hold the weight of the lance, as the English name might suggest, but to stop the rearward movement of the weapon upon impact.  This would allow the wielder of the lance to couch the weapon more securely, thus delivering a more solid blow to his target while lessening the chance of injury to himself.  The lance rest achieves this by spreading the impact of a blow through the breastplate to the torso of the wearer, thus redirecting the force of the blow away from the hand, wrist, elbow, and shoulder.

A grapper (arrêt de lance) was a ring of wood, leather or metal affixed to the lance just behind the hand grip. The grapper would be placed on the front edge of the arrêt, and together they would form a solid point of resistance to magnify the impact of the lance in the couched position.

The lance rest is typically bolted to the side of the breastplate or secured through the use of metal tabs known as staples.  Most lance rests were hinged so that they could be folded upwards to prevent interference with the wearer's sword arm once the lance had been discarded after the initial impact in favor of a sword.

References

Medieval armour
Western plate armour